Brallobarbital was a barbiturate developed in the 1920s. It has sedative and hypnotic properties, and was used for the treatment of insomnia. Brallobarbital was primarily sold as part of a combination product called Vesparax, composed of 150 mg secobarbital, 50 mg brallobarbital and 50 mg hydroxyzine. The long half-life of this combination of drugs tended to cause a hangover effect the next day, and Vesparax fell into disuse once newer drugs with lesser side effects had been developed. Vesparax reportedly was the drug that musician Jimi Hendrix supposedly overdosed on and led to his untimely death. It is no longer made.

References 

Barbiturates
Organobromides
Alkene derivatives
GABAA receptor positive allosteric modulators
Allyl compounds